Johnossi is the debut album by Swedish rock duo Johnossi, released on September 25, 2006.

Track listing
 "The Show Tonight" 3:50
 "Execution Song" 2:14
 "Glory Days to Come" 2:54
 "There's a Lot of Things to Do Before You Die" 2:38
 "Man Must Dance" 2:34
 "Family Values" 3:30
 "Press Hold" 4:34
 "Rescue Team" 2:58
 "From Peoples Heart" 2:58
 "Santa Monica Bay" 2:35
 "The Lottery" 4:00
 "Summerbreeze" 2:52

References

2006 debut albums
Johnossi albums